The Škoda Fabia RS Rally2 is a rally car built by Škoda Motorsport that is based on the fourth generation Škoda Fabia production car. It is the second upgraded generational update of the original Fabia R5, replacing the Fabia Rally2 evo.

Development
Four notable drivers helped to develop the Fabia RS Rally2; Andreas Mikkelsen, Brit Kris Meeke, Czech Republic's Jan Kopecký and Finland's Emil Lindholm. The car was tested extensively on various surfaces such as gravel, snow and asphalt, and in locations such as Finland, Spain, France and Italy.

The car was launched on 14 June 2022 at a presentation at Škoda headquarters in Mlada Boleslav, Czech Republic, before winning on its competitive debut on the Lausitz Rally held in Germany in November 2022 with Norwegian crew Andreas Mikkelsen and Torstein Eriksen.

References

External links
  
 Škoda Fabia RS Rally2 at eWRC-results.com

2020s cars
All-wheel-drive vehicles
Cars introduced in 2022
Cars of the Czech Republic
Rally2 cars
Fabia RS Rally2